Larry Fay (1888 – January 1, 1933) was one of the early rumrunners of the Prohibition Era in New York City.  He made a half a million dollars bringing whiskey into New York from Canada. With his profits he bought into a taxi cab company and later opened a nightclub, the El Fey, on West 47th Street in Manhattan in 1924, featuring Texas Guinan as the emcee and a floorshow produced by Nils Granlund. In the 1920s, he married Evelyn Crowell, a Broadway showgirl. 

Fay, who had a record of forty-nine arrests but no felony convictions, was involved in several enterprises in the ensuing years, and was said to have amassed and lost a fortune.  He was made a partner of the Casa Blanca Club, where he was fatally shot after a 1932 New Year's Eve celebration by the club's doorman Edward Maloney who had just learned his pay was being reduced by Fay to accommodate a new employee.  After his murder his wife discovered he was broke.

On December 15, 1960, The Untouchables (1959 TV series) during its second season did The Larry Fay Story.  This episode (the 37th for the series) starring Sam Levene as milk racketeer Larry Fay, an associate of Al Capone, dealt with Larry Fay's activities in New York City milk price-fixing case. Also, Fay's life served as the basis for James Cagney's character, Eddie Bartlett, in the 1939 gangster film, The Roaring Twenties.

References

1888 births
1933 deaths
Businesspeople from New York City
Deaths by firearm in New York City
1933 murders in the United States
20th-century American businesspeople